Serrapio is one of 18 parishes (administrative divisions) in Aller, a municipality within the province and autonomous community of Asturias, in northern Spain.

The main towns are Serrapio, Uries, El Casar, as well as the smaller villages  of El Pedregal and La Casa Baxo. El Corazal, Los Praos, Rozadiella, Tablizo, Barreo, Les Quintanes, Cotzrexu, Bustianes, La Guariza and Riafarta are mostly uninhabited.

The Gabinete de Antigüedades ("Antiquities Cabinet") has oversight over the Iglesia de San Vicente de Serrapio.

References

Parishes in Aller